Galo Chiriboga is an Ecuadorian lawyer, politician, administrator and the president of "La Asociación Interamericana de Juristas". He is best known as the "Oil Minister for Ecuador".

He was Minister of Trabajo, de Gobierno y Presidente de Petroecuador during the Alfredo Palacio regime and Minister of Petroleum and Mines during the administration of Rafael Correa. In 2011, he became General Attorney of Ecuador.

He has been linked with the off-shore firm  Mossack Fonseca

In defense of Panama Papers Oficial Video

References

Year of birth missing (living people)
Living people
20th-century Ecuadorian lawyers
Government ministers of Ecuador
PAIS Alliance politicians
People named in the Panama Papers
21st-century Ecuadorian lawyers
Attorneys general